David Ian Marquand  (born 20 September 1934) is a British academic and former Labour Party Member of Parliament (MP).

Background and political career

Marquand was born in Cardiff; his father was Hilary Marquand, also an academic and former Labour MP. His younger brother was the film maker Richard Marquand, and James Marquand is his nephew. Marquand was educated at Emanuel School in Battersea, London, Magdalen College, Oxford, St Antony's College, Oxford, and at the University of California, Berkeley.

Marquand first stood for Parliament at the Welsh seat of Barry in 1964, but was defeated by the Conservative incumbent Raymond Gower. He was elected the MP for Ashfield from 1966 to 1977, when he resigned his seat to work as Chief Advisor (from 1977 to 1978) to his mentor Roy Jenkins who had been appointed President of the European Commission.

During the 1970s split between 'Croslandite' and 'Jenkinsite' social democrats within the Labour Party, Marquand was part of the Jenkins group and joined the Social Democratic Party (SDP) when it was founded. Marquand sat on the party's national committee from 1981 to 1988 and was an unsuccessful candidate for the party in the High Peak constituency in the 1983 General Election. When the SDP merged with the Liberal Party to form the Liberal Democrats, Marquand remained with the successor party until rejoining the Labour Party in 1995, following the election of Tony Blair as Labour leader. In October 2016, it was reported that Marquand had left Labour once more, and had joined Plaid Cymru.

Academic career and writings
Marquand's academic career began as lecturer in Politics at the University of Sussex and included the occupancy of two chairs in Politics, first at Salford and then at Sheffield and finally as Principal of Mansfield College, Oxford. Marquand is currently a visiting fellow, Department of Politics, University of Oxford and Honorary Professor of Politics, University of Sheffield.

Marquand's writings are broadly based upon issues surrounding British politics and social democracy. He is widely linked to the term "progressive politics" and the concept of a "progressive dilemma" in British politics, although he has since distanced himself from the term (if not the ideas it represents). Marquand has written extensively on the future of the European Union and the need for constitutional reform in the United Kingdom.

In the aftermath of Labour's defeat in the 1979 election, Marquand wrote "Inquest on a Movement: Labour's Defeat and Its Consequences" for the July 1979 issue of Encounter. He argued that it was the influx of middle-class radicals into the Labour Party during the interwar years that had transformed Labour from a trade union pressure group into the main progressive party. All of its leaders since 1935 and many of its most prominent members had come from this class, crucially shaping the party's ethos. However, with Labour moving to the left in the 1970s, Marquand believed that the party was becoming intolerantly proletarian and attached to an old-fashioned socialism. This change in the party was symbolised by the election of James Callaghan as party leader in 1976, the least intellectual of the candidates. Marquand wrote that Labour had "outlived its usefulness" as a means to progressive social change and that middle-class radicals needed a new platform for their ideas. For this article Marquand was awarded (jointly with E. P. Thompson) the George Orwell Memorial Prize for 1980.

Marquand addressed Britain's relative economic decline in The Unprincipled Society (1988) and The New Reckoning (1997). He argued that this decline was caused by Britain's failure to become a developmental state like France, Germany and Japan. In those countries state intervention had encouraged industrial development and had facilitated the necessary adjustments to competition. Britain, however, was wedded to an economic liberalism which prevented the state from undertaking the necessary measures to meet the country's developmental needs. In The New Reckoning Marquand claimed: "The economies that have succeeded more spectacularly have been those fostered by developmental states, where public power, acting in concert with private interest, has induced market forces to flow in the desired direction".

Originally a tentative supporter of Blair's New Labour, he has since become a trenchant critic, arguing that "New Labour has 'modernised' the social-democratic tradition out of all recognition", even while retaining the over-centralisation and disdain for the radical intelligentsia of the old "Labourite" tradition. He is one of 20 signatories to the founding statement of the democratic left-wing group Compass.

In August 2008, Marquand published an article in The Guardian newspaper which was seen by some as being complimentary about Conservative Party leader David Cameron. Marquand called Cameron not a crypto-Thatcherite but a Whig and argued that Cameron "offers inclusion, social harmony and evolutionary adaptation to the cultural and socio-economic changes of his age."

Marquand was among 30 people to put his name to a letter to The Guardian – "Lib Dems Are The Party of Progress" – in support of the Liberal Democrats at 2010 general election but withdrew this support less than a month after the election.
Marquand rejoined the Labour Party and came out in full support of the-then leader Ed Miliband.

He was elected a Fellow of the British Academy in 1998. He is recognised by the newly opened Marquand Reading Room at his old school, Emanuel School in London.

References

Bibliography
Ramsay MacDonald, Jonathan Cape, 1977
"Inquest on a Movement: Labour’s Defeat & Its Consequences," Encounter, July 53, 1979
Parliament for Europe, Jonathan Cape, 1979
(w. David Butler), British politics and European elections, Longmans, 1981
(ed.) John Mackintosh on Parliament and Social Democracy, Longmans, 1982
The Unprincipled Society, Fontana Press, London, 1988
(w. Colin Crouch (eds.)), The New Centralism: Britain Out of Step in Europe?, Blackwell, Oxford, 1989
(w. Colin Crouch (eds.)), 'The Politics of 1992: Beyond the Single European Market, Blackwell, Oxford, 1990
(w. Colin Crouch (eds.)), Towards Greater Europe? A Continent Without an Iron Curtain, Blackwell, Oxford, 1992
(w. Colin Crouch (eds.)), Ethics and Markets: Cooperation and Competition within Capitalist Economies, Blackwell, Oxford, 1993
(w. Colin Crouch (eds.)) Re-inventing Collective Action, from the global to the local, Blackwell, 1995
(w. Seldon A (eds.)),  The Ideas that Shaped Post-War Britain, Fontana Press, London, 1996
'Community and the Left', in Giles Radice (ed.), What Needs to Change: New Visions for Britain, HarperCollins, London, 1996
The New Reckoning: Capitalism, States and Citizens, Polity Press, Oxford, 1997
Ramsay Macdonald: A Biography, Metro Books, London, 1997
Must Labour win?, Fabian Society, London, 1998
"Premature Obsequies: Social Democracy Comes in From the Cold," The New Social Democracy, Blackwell, Oxford, 1999
The Progressive Dilemma: From Lloyd George to Blair, Phoenix Giant, London, 1999
"Pluralism vs. Popularism," Prospect, June 1999
(w. Ronald Nettler), Religion and Democracy, Blackwell, Oxford, 2000
"Can Blair Kill off Britain’s Tory state at last?," New Statesman, 14 May 2001
The Decline of the Public: The Hollowing Out of Citizenship, Polity Press, Cambridge, 2004
"The public domain is a gift of history. Now it is at risk," New Statesman, 19 January 2004
"A direct line to the Almighty," New Statesman, 2 May 2005
"A leader I’d have followed," New Statesman, 15 August 2005
"The betrayal of social democracy…," New Statesman, 16 January 2006
"Mammon's kingdom:An essay on Britain, Now", Allen Lane, 2014

External links 
 

1934 births
Living people
Academics of the University of Salford
Academics of the University of Sheffield
Academics of the University of Sussex
Alumni of Magdalen College, Oxford
Alumni of St Antony's College, Oxford
Principals of Mansfield College, Oxford
Fellows of the British Academy
Fellows of the Royal Historical Society
Labour Party (UK) MPs for English constituencies
Liberal Democrats (UK) politicians
People educated at Emanuel School
Politicians from Cardiff
Social Democratic Party (UK) parliamentary candidates
UK MPs 1966–1970
UK MPs 1970–1974
UK MPs 1974
UK MPs 1974–1979
British republicans